A KHL territorial pick was a special type of draft pick used in the KHL Junior Draft. A Kontinental Hockey League team could protect up to 3 players from its Minor Hockey League affiliate or its hockey school(s) and use its first-round pick to draft one of its protected players.

However, unlike the NBA territorial picks, where NBA teams used territorial draft picks sparsely, KHL teams frequently used such picks to keep local talent. Also, in the KHL, the territorial draft picks were factored into the overall selection count. As such, a KHL team could draft more than one territorial pick; it happened in 2010 when Lokomotiv Yaroslavl, as well as Traktor Chelyabinsk used their two first-round draft picks on territorial picks.

For 2012, the rules changed: now a team could protect up to 5 players and use any pick, regardless of round, to select them, unless entering the disaster draft, in which case a team can protect as many players as they want for the five years following the disaster draft.
The KHL Junior Draft was discontinued in 2016.

Key

List of territorial draft picks

References

Kontinental Hockey League